Bad Füssing is a municipality in the district of Passau in Bavaria in Germany. Located some 3 km from the river Inn, which creates a border to Austria.

Attractions 
Known for its thermal bathes, Bad Füssing is part of the Lower Bavarian Spa Triangle. 

The sulphurous water source of 56°C was found in 1938 in a depth of about 1 km when drilling for oil. The first spa started only in 1950 and later developed to more establishments. There are three public baths, the largest is based on a well bored in 1964.

References

Passau (district)
Spa towns in Germany